RAF South Ruislip, also known as South Ruislip Air Station, was a non-flying Air Force station located in South Ruislip near London, England. Located close to RAF Northolt, the station was used by the United States Air Force's Third Air Force from 1949 until 1972, when the headquarters were moved to RAF Mildenhall.

History
The station opened in April 1949 and was leased by the United States Air Force as an administrative station to coordinate Third Air Force (USAFE) and 7th Air Division activities in Great Britain with the British Government. The site was leased from the Ministry of Defence. Logistical and support functions were located at RAF West Ruislip, leased by the United States Navy from the Ministry of Defence. All flying support was located at RAF Northolt that was supported by Detachment 1, 66th Tactical Reconnaissance Wing and later by Detachment 1, 20th Tactical Fighter Wing. The site included the 7520th U.S. Air Force Hospital.

A school for the children of American service personnel was established at RAF Eastcote in the 1950s, later joined by other welfare facilities. In 1970, American teenagers Dewey Bunnell, Dan Peek and Gerry Beckley, whose fathers were stationed at the base, formed the folk rock group America.

The total number of staff employed at the station had reached 1,733, including 487 British civilians, and the remainder made up of US Air Force personnel and civilians.

Closure

In 1972 the Third Air Force moved operations from the station to RAF Mildenhall. The Ministry of Transport used portions of the base for records storage in the mid-1970's. Thereafter, the buildings that had formed the main part of the base on Victoria Road stood empty until they were demolished in 1995, but were briefly used by the BBC as a filming location for the final series of the popular television police drama Z Cars in 1977 and 1978. Retail units have been built on the site of the former base since its demolition.

See also
 List of former Royal Air Force stations

References

External links
 Ruislip Online feature about the base

Royal Air Force stations in London
Installations of the United States Air Force in the United Kingdom
Former buildings and structures in the London Borough of Hillingdon
Military history of Middlesex
Military installations established in 1949
Military installations closed in 1972